The Reawakening of Egypt, also translated Egypt's Renaissance, is an electoral alliance in Egypt that was established by Abdelgelil Mostafa to contest the 2015 Egyptian parliamentary election. It had candidates in the race, but later withdrew them.

Electoral lists 
The alliance initially submitted electoral lists for all of the four constituencies. The alliance however refused to repeat costly medical examinations even for candidates already examined in February 2015, and went to the Administrative Court requesting free medical examination and a reopening of the candidate application. The court however upheld the requirement. After an appeal was turned down by Egypt's Supreme Administrative Court, the alliance withdrew all of its lists, forestalling their inevitable rejection by the High Election Commission.

Composition 
Mostafa aimed to create electoral lists excluding the Muslim Brotherhood and former members of the National Democratic Party. 120 candidates will be selected to run. The 25-30 Alliance has stated that it is not part of the alliance. The parties affiliated with the National Front Alliance have joined the Reawakening of Egypt. The Dignity Party withdrew from the alliance after several Dignity Party candidates were not selected for the electoral lists.

Affiliated parties and coalitions
 National Bloc
 Socialist Party of Egypt
 Egyptian Communist Party
 Civil Democratic Current
Egyptian Democratic
Nasserist Party
Future of Egypt Party
National Progressive Unionist Party (Tagammu)
Conference Party
 Socialist Popular Alliance Party
 Justice Party
 Reform and Renaissance Party

References

Political party alliances in Egypt